The Utah chub (Gila atraria) is a cyprinid fish native to western North America, where it is abundant in the upper Snake River and throughout the Lake Bonneville basin.

This chub generally follows the cyprinid body plan. Its dorsal fin lies directly over the pelvic fins, and usually has nine rays. Coloration is rather variable; the back is usually a metallic or olive green ranging to nearly black, and sometimes with a bluish shade, while the sides are silvery, brassy, or golden. Males have somewhat more of a golden look, especially during breeding season, often including a narrow golden stripe along the upper side. Fin colors include dull olive, yellow, and golden shades. It has been recorded in Bear Lake at up to 56 cm in length and 1.5 kg weight, but 40 cm is more typical, and in many areas 15–20 cm is the norm.

Utah chubs are omnivorous, consuming both plants and a variety of insects, crustacea, snails, and sometimes small fish or fish eggs.

It lives in a variety of habitats within its range, from irrigation ditches to ponds to large rivers and lakes, preferring areas with dense vegetation. It is also known from alkaline and salty springs found on desert floors. Most seem to frequent depths of a meter or less, but one was caught in Bear Lake at a depth of 25 meters.

Spawning occurs during late spring and summer, in shallow water (less than a meter deep). 2-6 males escort each female, and fertilize the eggs she scatters at random on the bottom. The eggs then hatch in about a week, the exact time depending on water temperature.

Although easily taken with a hook and line, anglers do not consider it a desirable catch, and often find it a nuisance while going after trout. Wildlife agencies have even tried eradication programs to reduce the numbers, but have had no effect, the chub population bouncing back easily.

References

External links
 
 William F. Sigler and John W. Sigler, Fishes of the Great Basin (Reno: University of Nevada Press, 1987), pp. 163–166

  Montana Animal Field Guide - Utah Chub Detailed Information

Utah
Gila (fish)
Taxa named by Charles Frédéric Girard
Fish described in 1856
Endemic fauna of the United States
Fish of the Western United States
Freshwater fish of the United States
Fauna of the Northwestern United States
Fauna of the Rocky Mountains
Utah chub